Pakistan competed at the 1960 Summer Olympics in Rome, Italy. 44 competitors, all men, took part in 35 events in 7 sports. Here, they won their first Olympic Games gold medal by defeating India in the final of the men's hockey competition. The country also landed their first individual Olympic Games medal, a bronze, through welterweight wrestler Mohammad Bashir in the freestyle contests. Making this Pakistan's most successful Olympics to date.

Medalists
 Gold medal in the men's hockey competition and a bronze medal in the men's freestyle wrestling

Athletics

Men's 100 metres

 Abdul Khaliq
 Heat 2; 11.2 (→ did not advance)

 Iftikhar Shah
 Heat 7; Retired

Men's 200 metres

 Iftikhar Shah
 Heat 1; Non-starter

 Abdul Khaliq
 Heat 4; 23.1 (→ did not advance)

Men's 5,000 metres

 Mubarak Shah
 Heat 4; 15:43.0 (→ did not advance)

Men's 4x100 metres relay

 Abdul Malik, Muhammad Ramzan Ali, Ghulam Raziq and Abdul Khaliq
 Heat 3; 42.5 (→ advanced to semifinals)
 2nd semifinal; 42.8 (→ did not advance)

Men's 110 metres hurdles

 Ghulam Raziq
 Heat 4; 14.6 (→ advanced to quarter-finals)
 2nd quarter-final; 14.4 (→ advanced to semifinals)
 2nd semifinal; 14.3 (→ did not advance)

 Abdul Malik
 Heat 5; 15.4 (→ did not advance)

Men's 400 metres hurdles

 Muhammad Yaqub
 Heat 3; 52.8 (→ did not advance)

Men's 3,000 metres steeplechase

 Mubarak Shah
 Heat 2; 9:20.0 (→ did not advance)

Men's long jump

 Muhammad Ramzan Ali
 Qualification 3rd series; Failed to record a jump

Men's hop, step and jump

 Muhammad Khan
 Qualification 3rd series; 14.43m (→ did not advance)

Men's pole vault

 Allah Ditta
 Qualification; 4.00m (→ did not advance)

Men's putting the shot

 Haider Khan
 Qualification; 16.47m (→ did not advance)

Men's throwing the hammer

 Muhammad Iqbal
 Qualification; 60.86m (→ qualified for final)
 Final; 61.79m finished 12th out of 15

Men's throwing the discus

 Haider Khan
 Qualification; 46.57m (→ did not advance)

Men's throwing the javelin

 Mohammad Nawaz
 Qualification 2nd series; 70.05m (→ did not advance)

Boxing

Men's bantamweight (up to 54 kg)

 Mohammad Nasir
 Round 1 thirtyseconds of final; Bye
 Round 2 sixteenths of final; Beat S Akbarzadeh (IRN) on pts
 Round 3 eighths of final; Lost to M Thein (BUR) on pts

Men's lightweight (up to 60 kg)

 Ghulam Sarwar
 Round 1 thirtyseconds of final; Bye
 Round 2 sixteenths of final; Lost to A Hernandez (MEX) on pts

Men's middleweight (up to 75 kg)

 Sultan Mahmood
 Round 1 sixteenths of final; Lost to T Walasek (POL) on pts

Men's light heavyweight (up to 81 kg)

 Mohammad Safdar
 Round 1 sixteenths of final; Bye
 Round 2 eighths of final; Lost to G Saraudi (ITA) on pts

Men's featherweight (up to 54 to 57;kg)
Saeed Hassan Butt
Final round fought with Mohammed Rashid. Outcome:Silver medalist in east pakistan dhaka olympics(Pakistan).

Cycling

Men's individual scratch sprint

 Mohammad Ashiq
 Heat 7; (→ sent to repechage)
 Repechage 5th; 12.8 Lost to L Mucino (MEX)

 Abdul Raziq Baloch
 Heat 8; (→ sent to repechage)
 Repechage 4th; 12.1 Lost to H Francis (USA)

Men's tandem sprint

 Mohammad Ashiq and Abdul Raziq Baloch
 Heat 2; Not present

Men's 1,000 metres standing start time trial

 Mohammad Ashiq
 1:20.17 finished 25th out of 25

Hockey

Men's Team Competition

Elimination rounds Round B
 Defeated  (3-0)
 Defeated  (8-0)
 Defeated  (10-0)

Quarter-finals
 Defeated  (2-1)

Semifinals
 Defeated  (1-0)

Final
 Defeated  (1-0)

Pakistan won the gold medal

Team Roster
 Abdul Hamid (captain)
 Ghulam Rasool (vice-captain)
 Abdul Rashid (gk)
 Rony Gardner (gk)
 Munir Dar
 Manzoor Hussain Atif
 Khurshid Aslam
 Bashir Ahmed
 Anwar Ahmed Khan
 Zafar Hayat
 Habib Ali Kiddie
 Noor Alam
 Khawaja Zakauddin
 Abdul Waheed
 Zafar Ali Khan
 Naseer Bunda
 Motiullah
 Mushtaq Ahmad

Shooting

Four shooters represented Pakistan in 1960.

25 m pistol
 Mohammad Iqbal
 253/248 = 501 finished 55th out of 57

50 m pistol
 Zafar Ahmed Muhammad
 Elimination rounds Group One; 59/77/74/79 = 289 finished 31st out of 33

300 m rifle, three positions
 Abdul Aziz Wains
 Elimination rounds Group One; 153/180/154 = 487 19th out of 20

50 m rifle, three positions
 Saifi Chaudhry
 Elimination rounds Group Two; 185/160/161 = 506 finished 34th out of 38

50 m rifle, prone
 Saifi Chaudhry
 Elimination rounds Group One; 95/89/96/93 = 373 finished 39th out of 43

Weightlifting

Men's bantamweight (57 kg)

 Mohammad Azam Mian
 Press not counted
 Snatch 82.5kg
 Jerk 100kg
 Total 182.5kg Unplaced

Men's lightweight (67.5 kg)

 Abdul Ghani Butt
 Press not counted
 Snatch 92.5kg
 Jerk 125.0kg
 Total 217.5kg Unplaced

Wrestling

Men's flyweight (52 kg)

 Nawab Din
 1st round; Beat S O'Connor (IRL) by fall
 2nd round; Beat V Dimitrov (BUL) on pts
 3rd round; Lost to M Matsubara (JPN) by fall
 4th round; Lost to A Bilek (TUR) by fall

Nawab Din ranked 9th out of 17

Men's bantamweight (57 kg)

 Muhammad Siraj-Din
 1st round; Beat W Pilling (GBR) by fall
 2nd round; Lost to T Jaskari (FIN) on pts
 3rd round; Lost to M Shakhov (USSR) on pts

Siraj Din ranked joint 10th out of 19

Men's featherweight (62 kg)

 Muhammad Akhtar
 1st round; Beat M Kederi (AFG) by fall
 2nd round; Lost to T Sato (JPN) on pts
 3rd round; Beat J Zurawski (POL) on pts
 4th round; Beat V Rubashvili (USSR) on pts
 5th round; Lost to M Dagistanli (TUR) by fall

Mohammad Akhtar ranked 6th out of 25

Men's lightweight (67 kg)

 Mohammad Din
 1st round; Beat to M Tajiki (IRN) by fall
 2nd round; Beat N Stamulis (AUS) on pts
 3rd round; Beat R Bielle (FRA) on pts

Mohammad Din ranked joint 12th out of 24

Men's welterweight (73 kg)

 Mohammad Bashir
 1st round; Beat Peter Amey (GRB) by fall
 2nd round; Beat Juan Rolon (ARG) on pts
 3rd round; Lost to Goudarzi Emam Habibi (IRN) on pts
 4th round; Beat Karl Bruggmann (SWI) by fall
 5th round; Beat Gaetano De Vescovi (ITA) on pts
 Final round bout 1; Lost to Ismail Ogan (TUR) on pts
 Final round bout 3; Lost to Douglas Blubaugh (USA) by fall

Mohammad Bashir won the bronze medal after being ranked 3rd out of 23

Men's middleweight (79 kg)

 Faiz Muhammad
 1st round; admitted to second round
 2nd round; Lost to T Nagai (JPN) on pts
 3rd round; Beat M A Khokan (AFG) on pts

Faiz Muhammad ranked 11th out of 19

Men's heavyweight (over 87 kg)

 Muhammad Nazir
 1st round; Lost to L Djiber (BUL) by fall
 2nd round; Beat N Subhani (AFG) on pts
 3rd round; Lost to H Kaplan (TUR) by fall

Mohammad Nazir ranked 12th out of 17

References

External links
Official Olympic Reports
International Olympic Committee results database

Nations at the 1960 Summer Olympics
1960
1960 in Pakistani sport